Sanna or Sanne is a female name. It is a Scandinavian short form of Susanna that in turn is a Greek version of a Hebrew name meaning "lily". It may also be a Sardinian surname; see Sanna (disambiguation).

Notable people
Female
Sanna Abubkheet (born 1984), Palestinian runner
Sanna Askelöf (born 1983), Swedish judoka
Sanna Bråding (born 1980), Swedish actress
Sanna Ejaz, Pakistani-Pashtun human rights activist
Sanna Frostevall (born 1979), Swedish footballer
Sanna Grønlid (born 1959), Norwegian biathlete
Sanna-June Hyde (born 1976), Finnish-English actress
Sanna Jalomäki, Finnish-Australian singer, painter and actress
Sanna Jinnedal (born 1993), Swedish model
Sanna Kallur (Susanna Kallur, born 1981), Swedish hurdler and sprinter
Sanna Kämäräinen (born 1986), Finnish discus thrower
Sanna Kannasto (1878–1968), Finnish-Canadian politician and feminist
Sanna Kurki-Suonio (born 1966), Finnish singer, kantele player and composer
Sanna Kyllönen (born 1971), Finnish sprinter
Sanna Lankosaari (born 1978, Finnish ice hockey player
Sanna Lehtimäki (born 1975), Finnish cyclist
Sanna Lüdi (born 1986), Swiss skier
Sanna Lundell (born 1978), Swedish journalist
Sanna Luostarinen (born 1976), Finnish actress
Sanna Malaska (born 1983), Finnish footballer and coach
Sanna Marin (born 1985), the 46th Prime Minister of Finland
Sanna Nielsen (born 1984), Swedish singer
Sanna Nymalm, Finnish orienteer
Sanna Persson (born 1974), Swedish comedian and actress
Sanna-Kaisa Saari (born 1987), Swedish-Finnish model
Sanna Savolainen, Finnish ski-orienteer
Sanna Sepponen (born 1977), Finnish actress
Sanna Sillanpää (born 1968), Finnish murderer
Sanna Solberg (born 1990), Norwegian handball player
Sanna Stén (born 1977), Finnish rower
Sanna Talonen (born 1984), Finnish footballer
Sanna Valkonen (born 1977), Finnish footballer
Sanne Vloet (born 1995), Dutch model
Sanna Visser (born 1984), Dutch volleyball player

Male
Sanna Nyassi (born 1989), Gambian footballer
Sanna Pakirappa (born 1958), Indian politician

See also
Sardinian surnames
Sanne (disambiguation)

References 

Scandinavian feminine given names
Finnish feminine given names